Winter Falls, is a waterfall located in the Silver Falls State Park at the east end of the city of Salem, in Marion County, in the U.S. state of Oregon. It is located in a privileged area on the west foothills where Mount Hood National Forest meets with the Middle Santiam Wilderness. Several prominent waterfalls are located in the Park along Trail of Ten Falls: South Falls, Lower South Falls, Lower North Falls, and Drake Falls—among others.

Location 
Winter Falls is created along the course of South Silver Creek and it sits on the north section of Silver Falls State Park Trail of Ten Falls, along Winter Falls Loop, half a mile south of Middle North Falls. Winter Falls is the fourth tallest waterfall in the Silver Falls State Park.

Description
Winter Creek, from which the waterfall is produced, only flows during the winter months, hence the name of both the stream and its cascade. Despite being one of the tallest waterfalls in the park, it is the one with the lowest flow volume. During the summer months, Winter Falls tends to be but a dribble of water spattering over the cliff of basalt.

See also 
 List of waterfalls in Oregon

References 

Waterfalls of Oregon